Henrik Gabriel Porthan (1739 in Viitasaari – 1804 in Turku) was a professor and rector at the Royal Academy of Turku. He was a scholar sometimes known as The Father of Finnish History.

Biography
He was born at Viitasaari in Tavastland, Finland.  Parents were Sigfrid Porthan and Kristina Juslenius. His father was a vicar who became mentally ill in 1744. He was raised by his uncle Gustaf Juslenius (1702-1774) who was the vicar of Kronoby in the county of Ostrobothnia. In 1754, at the age of 15, Porthan entered the Royal Academy of Turku (now University of Helsinki). He was a student of  professor Daniel Juslenius (1676–1752) who later served at Bishop of the Diocese of Borgå.

Porthan was awarded his Master of Philosophy in 1760. In 1762, he became an associate professor. He was a professor 1777–1804 and served as rector 1786–1787 and 1798–1799.

He became a Fennophile and brought Finnish history-writing, study of mythology and folk poetry, and other humanistic sciences to an international level. His De Poësi Fennica (published in five parts 1776-78), a study on Finnish folk poetry, had great importance in awakening public interest in the Kalevala-poetry and Finnish mythology, and the study was also the basis of all later study of the poetry.

He was among the founders of the Aurora Society that advocated Finnish literary pursuits and was the editor of the first Finnish newspaper, Tidningar ugifne af et sällskap i Åbo, founded in 1771. He instructed  Kristian Erik Lencqvist (1761–1808) whose 1782 dissertation De superstitione veterum Fennorum theoretica et practica was a seminal study of historic Finnish customs.

Porthan was also the instructor of poet Frans Mikael Franzén (1772–1847) and also inspired the following generation of Finnish authors, poets and researchers, many of whom were among the founders of the Finnish Literature Society in 1831.

The Porthania building of the University of Helsinki is named after Porthan.

Editions
The main edition of Porthan's works remains Opera selecta. Skrifter i urval, ed. by Sven Gabriel Elmgren and Josef August Schauman, 5 vols (Helsingfors: Finska Litteratur-Sällskapets tryckeri, 1859–73). However, scans of the original publications are now available via http://www.doria.fi.

See also 
Aurora Society

References

External links
Lauri Henrik Gabriel Porthan in 375 humanists 15.02.2015, Faculty of Arts, University of Helsinki

Further reading  
 
 

1739 births
1804 deaths
People from Viitasaari
University of Helsinki alumni
Academic staff of the University of Helsinki
18th-century Finnish educators
18th-century Finnish historians
Writers from Central Finland